Workers Power is the Swedish section of the League for the Fifth International, a small  Trotskyist organisation. 

It was founded in 1994, as a split from Socialistiska Partiet (the Swedish section of USFI). In 1998 it fused with another Trotskyist organisation, the Marxist Left (a split in 1996 from the CWI).

Arbetarmakt has been much involved in the anti-globalisation movement, but also in anti-racist struggles. It has an affiliated youth organisation, called Revolution , and a book store in Stockholm called Radikal .

As part of the League for the Fifth International they consider themselves to be orthodox Trotskyists.

External links
Official website
Far-left politics in Sweden
League for the Fifth International
Trotskyist organizations in Sweden